Excess & Overdrive is the third studio album by French industrial metal band Treponem Pal, released in 1993 on Roadrunner Records. The record was produced by The Young Gods singer Franz Treichler, with whom the band previously worked with on their 1989 debut. The track "Pushing You Too Far" was released as the album's lead single in 1993.

Being recorded after the band's 1992 Lollapalooza tour with Ministry, the album features elements from industrial music, hardcore and tribal music. The album was reissued with bonus tracks in 2009 by Metal Mind Productions.

Critical reception

AllMusic critic Romain Guillou described the record as the band's masterpiece and "a dark and powerful album," noting that the band's "compositions have now come to maturity" after the band's 1992 Lollapalooza tour. Guillou further wrote: "The vocal parts, deep and low, of Marco Neves may here be repellent at first for the listener not used to hardcore music, but the loud, intelligent guitars and the great quality of the songs will appeal to any industrial music lover." Alec of Foege of Spin thought that the record "immediately outplaces the impressively limber [1991's] Aggravation, perhaps due to Treichler's sharp-production," while stating that tight arrangements prevail over English-as-a-second-language lyrics on tracks such as "Out of Reach", "Pushing You Too Far" and "Stoned."

In a mixed review, Deseret Newss Scott Iwasaki wrote that the record was "filled with sinister riffs and abysmal feedback, but as the album progresses, the music regresses." Nevertheless, Iwasaki thought that the record was "mixed and balanced well," with "the sound and feedback effects being skillfully used and taking the listener on a trip through the senses."

Track listing
All music by Treponem Pal and all lyrics by Marco Neves, except where noted.

Personnel
Album personnel as adapted from liner notes:

Treponem Pal
 Marco Neves — vocals
 Michel Bassin — guitar
 Alain Fornasari — guitar, bass
 Amadou Sall — bass
 Didier Serbourdin — drums

Other personnel
 J.P. Deslandes — sampler (2)
 Franz Treichler — producer
 David Weber — recording engineer
 Bertrand Siffert — mixing
 Kevin Metcalfe — mastering
 Remi Deluze — photography
 Nicolas Pierroz — artwork
 PJP Grax — artwork
 Jacques Rouxel — design
 Patrick Jammes — management

References

External links
 

1993 albums
Roadrunner Records albums
Treponem Pal albums
Albums produced by Franz Treichler